Neil Raymond Conn,  (born 17 August 1936) is an Australian economist and former Administrator of the Northern Territory (1997-2000).

Conn was appointed by Queen Elizabeth II as Lord Prior of the Order of Saint John in 2014. He was succeeded by Sir Malcolm Ross in 2016.

Life and career 
Conn studied economics at the University of Sydney, graduating BSc and later MEc. He studied for his doctorate (PhD) at Duke University in the United States, before lecturing in economics at Sydney University from 1961 to 1975. He left the university in 1975 to work for two years as Principal Administrator with the OECD in Paris, followed by four years as Deputy Secretary of the New South Wales Treasury.

Conn was appointed by the newly independent Northern Territory government as Chief Executive Officer of the territory's treasury and was the Administrator of the Northern Territory from 17 February 1997 to 30 October 2000.

Following his retirement as administrator, Conn became foundation chairman of Original IT Investments Pty Ltd, an information technology incubator. From 2001 to 2004 he was the deputy chairman and lead independent director of the publicly listed company International All Sports Ltd.

Conn lives in Sydney with his wife Lesley, also a Member of the Order of Australia and a Dame of the Order of Saint John. They have three children.

Order of St John
Conn was appointed a deputy prior of the Order of Saint John in Australia in 1997. He served as chairman of St John Ambulance Australia from 2004 to 2007.

At the 2007 St John Ambulance Australia National Priory Conference, he was nominated as chancellor of the St John Priory in Australia, replacing Villis Marshall.

In 2014, Conn was promoted as the Lord Prior of the Order of Saint John, becoming its most senior non-royal figure. He was succeeded by Sir Malcolm Ross in 2016.

Honours

See also 
 The Alliance of the Orders of Saint John of Jerusalem
 Government of Australia

References

Notes

External links
 Conn's profile on the Northern Territory Government website
 Order of St John website
 Who's Who in Australia

 

 

1936 births
Living people
Australian Anglicans
Administrators of the Northern Territory
University of Sydney alumni
Academic staff of the University of Sydney
Officers of the Order of Australia
Bailiffs Grand Cross of the Order of St John
Duke University alumni
Recipients of the Centenary Medal